Bangs is an unincorporated community in Knox County, in the U.S. state of Ohio.

History
The village was built along the Cleveland, Mt. Vernon, and Columbus Railroad about 1873 as the railroad was being constructed. 
A post office called Bangs was established in 1874, and remained in operation until 1955. The railroad village was named for George Bangs, a postal official.

Notable residents 
The fictional photographer, Lillian Virginia Mountweazel, who died in 1973 in an explosion while on assignment for Combustibles magazine, was born there. She was known for her photo-essays of unusual subject matter, including New York City buses, the cemeteries of Paris, and rural American mailboxes.

References

Unincorporated communities in Knox County, Ohio
1873 establishments in Ohio
Populated places established in 1873